The sherwood dogfish or Sherwood's dogfish (Scymnodalatias sherwoodi) is a very rare sleeper shark of the family Somniosidae, found only around New Zealand.  The only specimen studied was about 80 cm long.

The sherwood dogfish is ovoviviparous.

Conservation status 
In June 2018 the New Zealand Department of Conservation classified the sherwood dogfish as "Not Threatened" with the qualifier "Secure Overseas" under the New Zealand Threat Classification System.

References

Scymnodalatias
Endemic marine fish of New Zealand
Fish described in 1921